Chasing Cameron is an American reality television series starring Vine star Cameron Dallas. It premiered on Netflix on December 27, 2016. The series centers on Cameron Dallas, a "social media influencer", who is best known for his prominence on the video app Vine. He is one of the main members of a group called Magcon (Meet and greet convention), which was short-lived in 2014, but revived, partly with other people, in 2016. During 2016, Magcon went on a tour in Europe, Australia and New Zealand, with events consisting of a show and a meet and greet.

The half-hour episodes depict Cameron and other Magcon members' road to fame, and the price that comes with Internet stardom, including a physical altercation that occurred in a European club. The show's co-starring tour members include Aaron Carpenter, Taylor Caniff and Nash Grier, as well as Dallas' immediate family members. The first season of the show consisted of ten episodes.

Production 
The series was announced on June 22, 2016 via Variety.

The show premiered on Netflix on December 27, 2016.

On January 20, 2017, Dallas said in a red carpet interview at the People's Choice Awards: "For sure. 100% there will be a season 2. [...] I think it's gonna dive deeper more into my relationship between my mom and sister, and then kind of a more in-depth view on where we're going and what's continuing to go on, because we're only taking steps forward, so I feel like the more we go, the more interesting it gets". Dallas also stated that the second season would feature a different premise altogether.

Cast
 Cameron Dallas
 Taylor Caniff
 Aaron Carpenter
 Blake Gray
 Willie Jones
 Trey Schafer
 Joey Birlem
 Hunter Rowland
 Brandon Rowland
 Darrick Landreneau
 Mackenzie Becker

Episodes

Reception
Since the release of Chasing Cameron the series has received generally negative reviews. Common Sense Media's critical consensus reads, "Internet star's self-serving reality show has iffy messages", while giving the show a rating of 1/5. Kevin O'Keeffe, writing for mic.com also criticized the show, stating "his hesitance to let go of control makes Chasing Cameron a far worse show than it could have been". Michael Andor Brodeur, writing for The Boston Globe, was somewhat more receptive, writing "There’s something about the abundant emptiness of “Chasing Cameron” that, right now, feels like a necessary refuge [...] basking in its inconsequential glow."

References

External links
 

2016 American television series debuts
2016 American television series endings
English-language Netflix original programming
Television series about social media